RAF Mattishall is a former Royal Flying Corps landing ground located  east of Mattishall, Norfolk and  north west of Norwich, Norfolk, England.

History

The landing ground was in use during the First World War initially under the control of the Royal Flying Corps until 1 April 1918 when the site was turned over to the Royal Air Force and was renamed from RFC Mattishall to RAF Mattishall. The site was used by aircraft intercepting Zeppelin bombers. Aircraft of 51 Squadron operated from Mattishall.

Current use
The airfield has been returned to use for agriculture.

See also
List of former Royal Air Force stations

References

External links
History at Mattishall village website

Royal Air Force stations in Norfolk
Royal Air Force stations of World War II in the United Kingdom